Eileen Charbonneau is a novelist whose books include The Connor Emerald (2000), Rachel LeMoyne (1999), The Randolph Legacy (1998), and Waltzing in Ragtime (1996). Her books for young people are The Ghosts of Stony Clove (1988), In the Time of Wolves (1994), Honor to the Hills (1997). Charbonneau was raised in Valley Stream, New York. She lives in the Hudson River Valley of New York, and in the Catskill Mountains, with her husband.  They have two daughters, Abigail and Marya, and a son, Lawrence. Eileen Charbonneau is sister to the actress Patricia Charbonneau.

References

Living people
American women novelists
American young adult novelists
20th-century American novelists
Novelists from New York (state)
20th-century American women writers
Women writers of young adult literature
Year of birth missing (living people)
21st-century American women